Mariana Borelli (born 30 October 1992) is an Argentine middle-distance runner. She has won several medals at a regional level.

Her twin sister, Florencia Borelli, is also a runner.

International competitions

Personal bests
Outdoor
800 metres – 2:06.96 (São Paulo 2014)
1000 metres – 2:52.95 (Mar del Plata 2015)
1500 metres – 4:20.74 (Trujillo 2018)
3000 metres – 9:47.37 (Mar del Plata 2017)
10 kilometres – 35:08 (San Bernardo 2017)
15 kilometres – 57:30 (Buenos Aires 2017)
Half marathon – 1:22:20 (Mar del Plata 2015)

References

1992 births
Living people
Argentine female middle-distance runners
Pan American Games competitors for Argentina
Athletes (track and field) at the 2019 Pan American Games
21st-century Argentine women